Gayathri Arun is an Indian actress known for her work in Malayalam films and television serials. She is well known for portraying the character Deepthi IPS in Malayalam soap opera, Parasparam. She also acted in movies such as Sarvopari Palakkaran, Ormma, One and Ennalum Ente Aliya. She hosted various television shows. Her first book named Achappam Kadhakal was published on 5 September 2021.

Filmography

Films
All films are in Malayalam language unless otherwise noted.

Television

Special appearances

Published works

References

Living people
Malayali people
Actresses from Kerala
Indian soap opera actresses
21st-century Indian actresses
Actresses in Malayalam television
Actresses in Malayalam cinema
1987 births